Peter Hedström is one of the founders of the field of analytical sociology. He has made contributions to the analysis of social contagion processes and complex social networks, as well as to the philosophical and meta-theoretical foundations of analytical sociology. He is one of the key contributors to the literature on social mechanisms.

Hedström received his Ph.D. at Harvard University in 1987. He then took a post as assistant professor at the University of Chicago, and, in 1989, he received a professor chair at the department of sociology, Stockholm University. In 2003, he assumed a position as Official Fellow and professor at Nuffield College, University of Oxford, which he left in 2011 to become the director of the Institute for Futures Studies in Stockholm. During the 2008/2009 he was dean of the School of Social Sciences at the Singapore Management University. in 2014, Hedström started the Institute for Analytical Sociology at Linköping University. Hedström is past president of the Swedish Sociological Association and has served as editor of Acta Sociologica and as associate editor of the American Journal of Sociology, Annual Review of Sociology,  and Rationality and Society. He is the president of the International Network of Analytical Sociology, past president of the European Academy of Sociology, and a Fellow of the Royal Swedish Academy of Sciences, the Royal Swedish Academy of Letters, History and Antiquities, the Norwegian Academy of Science and Letters and the Academia Europaea.

Key publications
 P. Hedström Dissecting the Social: On the Principles of Analytical Sociology. Cambridge University Press, 2005.
 P. Hedström and Peter Bearman (Eds.) The Oxford Handbook of Analytical Sociology. Oxford: Oxford University Press, 2009.
 P Hedström Causal mechanisms in the social sciences (with Petri Ylikoski). Annual Review of Sociology 36: 49–67.
 P. Hedström and Richard Swedberg (eds.) Social Mechanisms: An Analytical Approach to Social Theory. Cambridge: Cambridge University Press, 1998.

External links
 Institute for Analytical Sociology in Norrköping
 An article about Hedström's approach to sociology
 International Network of Analytical Sociology

Living people
Swedish sociologists
Harvard University alumni
Academic staff of Stockholm University
Fellows of Nuffield College, Oxford
Members of the Royal Swedish Academy of Sciences
Members of the Norwegian Academy of Science and Letters
Year of birth missing (living people)